Anna-Lena Grönefeld and Shahar Pe'er were the defending champions, but Grönefeld chose not to participate. Pe'er instead played with Sania Mirza.

Mirza and Pe'er went on to win the title, defeating Victoria Azarenka and Anna Chakvetadze in the final, 6–4, 7–6(7–5).

Seeds

Draw

External links
 ITF tournament draws

Doubles 2007
2007 WTA Tour